Florian Myrtaj (born 15 September 1976) is an Albanian former footballer who played as a striker.

Myrtaj, who moved to Italy in 1989, aged 13, after having been signed by the Modena F.C. youth section, is also an Italian citizen.

Club career
Myrtaj was born in Vlorë. He reached his highlight during his period at Verona, then in Serie B, where he spent two seasons with a total 13 goals.

Before joining Verona he was signed by Parma in 2002 and sold to Cesena in co-ownership deal along with Christian Terlizzi. In June 2003, Parma bought back Myrtaj and sold him to Verona. After leaving Verona in 2005, he had an unimpressive time at Catanzaro, again in Serie B, before returning to play in the third tier with a number of other teams, including a lacklustre return at Teramo; in September 2008 he joined Sorrento from Arezzo, and spent two seasons with the Campanian side.

International career
He made his debut for Albania in a January 2002 Bahrain Tournament match against Macedonia and earned a total of 25 caps, scoring 3 goals. His final international was a March 2006 friendly match against Lithuania.

International statistics

International goals

Post-playing career
After retirement, Myrtaj worked as a scout for Modena from July 2013 to February 2014.

References

External links

 Hellastory.net page on Florian Myrtaj
Albania National Team Appearances

1976 births
Living people
Footballers from Vlorë
Albanian footballers
Association football wingers
Albania international footballers
Modena F.C. players
U.S. Sassuolo Calcio players
Virtus Bergamo Alzano Seriate 1909 players
S.S. Teramo Calcio players
A.C. Cesena players
Hellas Verona F.C. players
U.S. Catanzaro 1929 players
A.C. Perugia Calcio players
S.S. Arezzo players
A.S.D. Sorrento players
Serie B players
Serie C players
Albanian expatriate footballers
Expatriate footballers in Italy
Albanian expatriate sportspeople in Italy